The Odisha Society of the Americas, or OSA, is an organization whose stated goals are to promote the culture of the Indian state of Odisha in the United States and Canada, and to facilitate the exchange of information between Odisha and North America. Founded in 1969, OSA is registered as a 501(c)(3) charitable organization in the United States. The main event of the organization is an annual convention which aims to bring members of the Odia diaspora together to celebrate their ethnic culture. It held an annual get-together called convention, where people of Odia origin from different parts of USA and Canada mingled and shared experiences of ethnic living.

Current status 
Today, OSA is a strong organization with 1500 or more individual and family members. This is due to individuals stepping forward to support different activities with innovative ideas which, when implemented, benefit us all. The organization has now spread into thirteen regional chapters, which operate as a social umbrella for different regions in the US and Canada. The chapters arrange various activities such as religious festivals, social get together, cultural events and participate in the cultural life of the local community as representatives of Odia culture. Besides these, the annual convention is the centerpiece of the society's activities.

Vision

The society's vision is to promote and propagate Odia culture in Americas by bringing together all the people interested in Odisha.

Mission Goals

The mission goals of The Odisha Society of Americas are:

· To provide a mutually supportive environment for the better interaction of Odia immigrants of North American countries through socio-cultural growth, friendship and fellowship.

· To enhance the awareness of Odisha and Odia traditions in North America through cultural promotion, social events, and developmental activities.

· To facilitate the exchange of information between Odisha and the United States/Canada.

Chapters in USA & Canada

There are 14 chapters in USA and 1 chapter in Canada. A new chapter, California chapter is under formation.

Events 
OSA Convention

The annual convention of The Odisha Society of the Americas takes place during the July 4th weekend every year. The main responsibility of hosting the convention rests with the local chapters of OSA. At times when local chapters do not bid for the convention, Odia communities under the leadership of an OSA life member and with 15 or more OSA members do take charge of organizing the convention. The convention serves to bring together people with roots in Odisha to share the pride in Odia culture and heritage and pass it on to the next generation. The annual convention is the centerpiece of OSA's activities. The 52nd OSA convention was held from July 2 to 4, 2021 at the newly built Orissa Culture Center Venue, Houston, Texas. The 53rd OSA convention was held from July 1 to 3, 2022 in Sacramento, California.

Past/Future OSA Conventions

OSA Regional Oriya Drama Festival

OSA Drama Festival started in 2009 for the first time. Dr Gopal Mohanty was the festival coordinator. The concept of regional drama festival went into effect during the month of April 2009 at 3 sites, Texas, Michigan and Washington DC. OSA is planning to continue the tradition in its present form or in an improved form (combining music and dances) for the future. OSA Southwest Chapter Drama Festival-2013 was held at Austin on 14 September 2013.

Publications

Odisha Society of Americas has been publishing souvenirs of its annual conventions from 1983. In 2019, all the editions were published in Amazon.com in print and Digital through Amazon.com, Google Play and Google Books.

OSA History

OSA Golden Jubilee Convention created History Team. The History Team collected VHS, Hi8 and DVD media of past conventions and events. Founders and members were interviewed. YouTube channel and PlayLists were created.

References

External links
Website

Odisha
Economy of Odisha
International friendship associations
Overseas Indian organisations
1970 establishments in the United States
Indian-American culture